The 2012–13 Macedonian First League was the 21st season of the Macedonian First Football League, the highest football league of Macedonia. Vardar were the defending champions after winning their sixth Macedonian championship at the end of the 2011–12 season. Twelve teams contested the league, comprising ten sides from the 2011–12 season and two promoted from the 2011–12 2. MFL.

Promotion and relegation

Participating teams

League table

Results 
Every team played three times against each other team for a total of 33 matches. The first 22 matchdays consisted of a regular double round-robin schedule. The league standings at this point were then be used to determine the games for the last 11 matchdays.

Matches 1–22

Matches 23–33

Relegation play-offs

Season statistics

Top scorers

 Players whose names are written with Italic letters played only during the first half of the season.

See also
2012–13 Macedonian Football Cup
2012–13 Macedonian Second Football League
2012–13 Macedonian Third Football League

References

External links
Football Federation of Macedonia 
MacedonianFootball.com 

Macedonia
1
2012-13